The men's 10,000 metres event at the 1997 Summer Universiade was held on 30 August at the Stadio Cibali in Catania, Italy.

Results

References

Athletics at the 1997 Summer Universiade
1997